The Saint Francis Cougars are the athletic teams that represent the University of Saint Francis, located in Fort Wayne, Indiana, in intercollegiate sports as a member of the National Association of Intercollegiate Athletics (NAIA), primarily competing in the Crossroads League (formerly known as the Mid-Central College Conference (MCCC) until after the 2011–12 school year) for most of its sports since the 1994–95 academic year (which they were a member on a previous stint from 1966–67 to 1980–81); while its football team competes in the Mideast League of the Mid-States Football Association (MSFA).

Varsity teams
USF competes in 19 intercollegiate varsity sports: Men's sports include baseball, basketball, cross country, football, golf, soccer, tennis and track & field; while women's sports include basketball, cross country, golf, soccer, softball, tennis, track & field and volleyball; and co-ed sports include cheerleading, crew and eSports.

National Championship appearances

Basketball
The University of Saint Francis Cougars won their first NAIA Championship on March 16, 2010. The Cougars won the 2010 NAIA Men's Division II basketball tournament when they defeated Walsh University 67-66 at Pt. Lookout, Missouri. The Cougars entered the tourney as the 15th seed. For his success, head coach Jeff Rekeweg was named the 2010 NAIA National Coach of the Year.  On April 19, 2010, after 14 seasons of guiding the Cougars, Rekeweg resigned to take the head coaches position at Northwood University, an NCAA Division II school located in Midland, Michigan.

The Cougars returned the following year to play in the championship game on March 15, 2011. That year, the Cougars were runners-up in the 2011 NAIA Men's Division II basketball tournament when the Cougars were defeated by Cornerstone (MI) 80-71. The Cougars entered the tourney as the 13th seed.

In 2021 The Cougars once again made a run at the National Title in the NAIA’s first year with one single division. The Cougars were awarded a first round bye after finishing as runner-up in the 2021 Crossroads League Tournament, and entered the round of 32. There they defeated Benedictine (KS), 73-65. In the round of 16, the Cougars defeated Stillman (AL), before a come from behind victory against fellow conference foe, Bethel (IN). In the Final Four, their fifth appearance since 2010, they fell just short against eventual champion Shawnee State.

Football

Saint Francis named Kevin Donley the Cougars' head coach in 1997.  After a year of preparation, Saint Francis began play, as Fort Wayne's first collegiate football program, in the 1998 season.  Coach Donley led USF to a record of 2-8 (.200), their first and only losing football season.

Since that initial season, Saint Francis has risen to become one of the top programs in all of NAIA football. From the 1999 season through the 2013 season, Donley-led teams have lost three or fewer games each season.  Eight teams have completed undefeated regular seasons (2002-2006, 2008, 2015, 2017), and three consecutive teams finished as national runners-up (2004-2006).

The Cougars made a fourth appearance in the national championship game in 2016, winning their first NAIA national title with their 38-17 win over Baker (KS) in the 2016 NAIA Football National Championship.  The following season, 2017, the Cougars returned a 5th time and successfully defended their title by defeating Rinehardt (GA) by a score of 24-13 in the 2017 NAIA Football National Championship.  The Cougars completed a 14-0 undefeated season.  This was only the 5th time in NAIA history that the back-to-back championships has occurred.

References

External links